The canton of La Ciotat is a canton located within the Bouches-du-Rhône department of France.

Composition
Since the French canton reorganisation which came into effect in March 2015, the communes of the canton of La Ciotat are:
Carnoux-en-Provence
Cassis 
Ceyreste
La Ciotat
Cuges-les-Pins
Gémenos
Roquefort-la-Bédoule

See also 
 Cantons of the Bouches-du-Rhône department
 Communes of the Bouches-du-Rhône department

References

External links
 Website of the General Council of Bouches-du-Rhône

Ciotat